Robert Gandell (1818 – 24 October 1887) was a British academic and biblical scholar, who was Laudian Professor of Arabic from 1861 until his death.

Life
Gandell, from London, was educated at Mill Hill School and King's College London.  He then moved to the University of Oxford, matriculating as a member of St John's College, Oxford, in 1839 but transferring to The Queen's College, Oxford, where he graduated with a Bachelor of Arts degree in 1843. He was a fellow of Queen's between 1845 and 1850, a tutor at Magdalen Hall, Oxford from 1848 to 1872 and a fellow at Hertford College, Oxford, from 1859 to 1861.  He was appointed Laudian Professor of Arabic in 1861, and was a prebendary of Wells Cathedral from 1874, becoming a canon in 1880.  His publications included a four-volume edition of John Lightfoot's Horae Hebraicae (1859), and commentaries on some books of the Old Testament.  He died in Wells on 24 October 1887.

References

1818 births
1887 deaths
People educated at Mill Hill School
Alumni of King's College London
Alumni of St John's College, Oxford
Alumni of The Queen's College, Oxford
Fellows of The Queen's College, Oxford
Fellows of Hertford College, Oxford
19th-century English Anglican priests
Laudian Professors of Arabic